Patricia Kalember (born December 30, 1956) is an American actress, best known for her role as Georgiana "Georgie" Reed Whitsig in the NBC drama series, Sisters (1991–1996). Kalember also had the leading roles in the number of television films, co-starred in the feature films, including Fletch Lives (1989), Jacob's Ladder (1990), A Far Off Place (1993), Signs (2002), The Company Men (2010), and Limitless (2011), and recurring roles in thirtysomething (1989–1991) and Law & Order: Special Victims Unit (2004–2010).

Life and career 
Kalember was born in Schenectady, New York, the daughter of Vivian Daisy (née Wright) and Robert James Kalember. She was raised in Westport, Connecticut, and Louisville, Kentucky. She received her BA in Theater from Indiana University and a MFA from Temple University. 
Kalember has been married to British actor Daniel Gerroll since 1986. They have three children. She was previously married to Mark Torres, an actor.

Kalember made her television debut in 1981, on the daytime soap opera Texas. She later was a regular cast member on Loving. She was nominated for an Outer Critics Circle Award for her  performance in the play The Foreigner (1986). In 1986, she had the leading role in the short-lived CBS drama series, Kay O'Brien. She also starred alongside Tim Matheson in the short-lived ABC sitcom Just in Time (1988). From 1989 to 1991, she appeared in a recurring role on thirtysomething.

Kalember may be best known for her role as Georgiana "Georgie" Reed Whitsig in the NBC drama series, Sisters, alongside Swoosie Kurtz, Sela Ward, and Julianne Phillips,  from 1991 to 1996. She later had the leading roles in a number of made-for-television films. Kalember had roles in such films as Cat's Eye (1985), Fletch Lives (1989), Jacob's Ladder (1990), Big Girls Don't Cry... They Get Even (1992), and A Far Off Place (1993).

She played the role of Margaret Craig McNamara in the HBO biographical film Path to War (2002) and appeared as Mel Gibson's character's wife in the science-fiction thriller, Signs that same year. She had guest roles on such television series as Touched by an Angel, Gossip Girl, The Good Wife, Blue Bloods, and Orange Is the New Black. Kalember played two different characters in Law & Order: Special Victims Unit; in 2001, she appeared in an episode of the second season, and from 2004 to 2010, she played Judge Karen Taten. Kalember co-starred in such films as The Girl in the Park, The Company Men, Rabbit Hole, and Limitless.

Filmography

Film

Television

References

External links
 
 

1956 births
American film actresses
American television actresses
Living people
Actresses from Louisville, Kentucky
People from Westport, Connecticut
Actors from Schenectady, New York
20th-century American actresses
21st-century American actresses